is a Japanese romantic comedy light novel series written by Sekaiichi and illustrated by Tomari (first two volumes) and Tom Osabe (from third volume). The series was initially launched as a web novel on May 15, 2018, on Shōsetsuka ni Narō. Overlap released a revised version of the series with illustrations on July 25, 2019, under its Overlap Bunko imprint. The series began publishing in English by Tentai Books from May 29, 2020. A manga adaptation illustrated by Harumare began serialization in Ichijinsha's Manga 4-koma Palette magazine on February 22, 2021 before being moved to Ichijinplus on March 26, 2022.

Plot 
Yuuki Tomoki, a second year high school student, is shunned by everyone because of his somewhat intimidating appearance with large scars under his eyes and strangely pale skin. One day, Touka Ike, the younger sister of Yuuji's best friend, confessed to him when they hadn't seen each other for long. Yuuji refused however Touka proposed a "fake lover" relationship to draw his brother's attention to her.

Characters 

Haruma's sister, Yuuji's best friend. In the first chapter of the manga adaptation, when she and Yuuji had just met not long ago, she confessed her love to Yuuji but Yuuji disagreed and she was the one who was talking about "fake lover".

The main character of the story, Yuuji is a 2nd year high school student. In the series, he is often feared by other students because of his pale white skin and a scar under his eye.

Haruma and Touka's childhood friend. In the series, Kana seems to be somewhat afraid of Yuuji.

Teacher of Yuuji School, she is a person with a good personality and is not afraid of Yuuji's appearance.

Yuuji's best friend. In the series, Hamura is described as the most popular in school for his looks and personality, however he is also said to be not very intelligent in everyday matters.

Media

Light novel 
The light novel series is written by Sekaiichi and illustrated by Tomari (first two volumes) and Tom Osabe (from third volume). The series was published as a web novel from May 15, 2018, on Shōsetsuka ni Narō. Overlap released an illustrated version on July 25, 2019, under its Overlap Bunko imprint. The English version was published by Tentai Books from May 29, 2020.

Manga 
A manga adaptation illustrated by Harumare was serialized in Ichijinsha's Manga 4-koma Palette magazine from February 22, 2021 to February 22, 2022, and began serialization in Ichijinsha's Ichijinplus manga website on March 26, 2022. Its manga chapters have been collected in two tankōbon volumes as of July 2022.

References

External links 
 Web novel at Shōsetsuka ni Narō 
 Official light novel website at Overlap 
 Official light novel English website at Tentai Books

2019 Japanese novels
Anime and manga based on light novels
Ichijinsha manga
Light novels
Light novels first published online
Overlap Bunko
Romantic comedy anime and manga
Seinen manga
Shōsetsuka ni Narō